Joseph Chellayya Daniel Nadar (28 November 1900  27 April 1975) was an Indian filmmaker who is considered as the father of Malayalam cinema. He was the first film-maker from Kerala. He produced, directed, wrote, photographed, edited and acted in the first film made in Kerala, Vigathakumaran (The Lost Child). He also established the first film studio in Kerala, The Travancore National Pictures. The Government of Kerala instituted the Kerala State Film Award for Lifetime Achievement in 1992 in his name, as a part of the Kerala State Film Awards, to honour lifetime achievements in Malayalam Cinema.

Early life

Daniel was born on 26 February 1900 to a Christian family in Agasteeswaram taluk, Travancore State (present-day Kanyakumari, Tamil Nadu). He finished his formal education from Maharaja's College, Trivandrum.  He published an English book titled Indian Art of Fencing and Sword Play in 1915, when he was 15 years old.

Learning film making

Daniel was well aware of the scope of cinema as a public medium. He wished to popularise Kalarippayattu by harnessing the popular influence of cinema. At that time the common man of Kerala was not even aware of the medium of cinema, hence the idea was quite a challenge. He took up the challenge and left for Madras (now Chennai) to learn techniques of film-making and to acquire necessary equipment for the purpose. Madras was the budding centre of film production in South India and had the only permanent talkies in South India, named Gaiety which was established in 1917. However, he was unable to realise his plans in Madras and was even denied entry to various studios in the city. That didn't stop the determined Daniel from pursuing his dream. He travelled to Bombay (now Mumbai), the centre of Hindi cinema production. He was able to obtain entry into film studios in the city, claiming that he is a teacher from Kerala and wanted to teach his students about cinema. He gathered enough knowledge and equipment for film production from Bombay and came back to Kerala to fulfill his dream.

Production of Vigathakumaran

In 1926, Daniel established the first film studio in Kerala named The Travancore National Pictures. It was near the present Public Service Commission office, Pattom, Trivandrum. He obtained funds for this purpose by selling a piece of land in his name for an amount of Rs.400,000. With everything set, Daniel finally started the production work of the film of his dreams. He wrote the script and titled it Vigathakumaran. The film did not have sound or dialogue. He directed and wielded the camera for the film and also played the role of the protagonist in the film. P. K. Rosie acted as the heroine. He also did most of the post-production work including editing.  The theme of the film was of social significance and was one of the earliest films of the genre.

Post-release of Vigathakumaran

Vigathakumaran was exhibited in Trivandrum at the Capitol Theatre on 7 November 1928. Despite being the very first film made in Kerala and having a socially-significant message, it faced the wrath of certain orthodox sections in the society due to the presence of a woman in the film. Rosie, who played the role of the female protagonist, was disbarred from entering the theatre, as upper-caste Hindus, outraged that a converted dalit played the role of a Nair woman in the film, created a ruckus. During the screening, stones were pelted on the screen, damaging it. The film did moderate business at the box office but the collections were way below the production cost.

The movie was also screened in Alleppey at the Star Theatre. Since it was a silent movie, there was an announcer at the theatre who would explain the story and the situation. Alleppey being one of the most important port towns in Kerala during that time, the audience were more liberal. They received the movie with excitement. There was a minor glitch once, when the screen faded and the audience booed. After the announcer explained that some minor problems might occur since this was the first Malayalam movie ever made and screened, the audience welcomed his statement with applause.

Vigathakumaran was also screened at Quilon, Trichur, Tellichery and Nagercoil.

Daniel became indebted as the movie was not a commercial success. To pay his debtors, he had to sell his equipments and close down the studio. He spent the rest of his life as a dentist at Palayamkottai, Tamil Nadu. He spent his last years in his ancestral home called NEW HOUSE at Agastheeswaram. Though he applied for pension under the scheme for ailing artists, the Government rejected it since he was born in Tamil Nadu.  In his books and articles, noted film journalist Chelangatt Gopalakrishnan originally established that Vigathakumaran was the first Malayalam film and that Daniel was its architect as director, producer, cinematographer and leading man.  He described the story of Vigathakumaran in articles published since 1960, but Kerala Government initially rejected his crusade citing Daniel was not a Malayalee. The Government version was that if Daniel wanted a pension or financial assistance, he has to approach the Tamil Nadu Government. However,Gopalakrishnan's campaign was finally successful and Daniel obtained government recognition as a Keralite, being honoured as the Father of Malayalam Cinema.

J.C Daniel died on 27 April 1975 and was survived by his wife.

J. C. Daniel Award

The Department of Cultural Affairs, Government of Kerala instituted the J. C. Daniel Award in honour of him in 1992. The award, a part of the Kerala State Film Awards is to honour lifetime achievements in outstanding contributions to Malayalam cinema. From 1998, the Kerala State Chalachitra Academy, an autonomous body under the Department of Cultural Affairs, Government of Kerala hosts the award.

J. C. Foundation Award
The awards are instituted by the J.C. Foundation, which was founded in memory of J.C. Daniel by his family and friends. The awards are given away annually for achievements in Malayalam film-making and literature. The film awards are given away in a variety of categories while the literature award is given for the best Malayalam novel.

Biographical film

In 2013, Kamal wrote and directed a biopic on Daniel titled Celluloid. The film details the struggles of Daniel to produce and exhibit Vigathakumaran, while plunging into financial crisis. The movie also generated criticism over its subtle reference to an IAS Officer and the then Chief Minister, which purportedly points to the bureaucrat & writer Malayattoor Ramakrishnan and K. Karunakaran, who worked together to deny J. C. Daniel credit for his contribution to Malayalam Cinema since he was a Christian (ref: audio recording of Chelangat Gopalakrishnan produced by Akashawani and published by a TV channel). Author and civil servant N. S. Madhavan and D. Babu Paul, former Chief Secretary of Kerala have pointed out factual inaccuracies in the film's depiction of Malayattoor and Karunakaran. The film, based partially on the novel Nashta Naayika by Vinu Abraham and the Life of J. C. Daniel, a biography by film journalist Chelangat Gopalakrishnan, also deals with the life of Rosie, the lead actress in Vigathakumaran. Prithviraj plays the role of Daniel, while Mamta Mohandas plays his wife Janet and newcomer Chandni plays Rosie. The film won 7 Kerala State Film Awards in different categories including that for Best Film.

The Lost Life is a documentary on Daniel by R. Gopalakrishnan.

References

External links
 

1900 births
1975 deaths
People from Kanyakumari district
Male actors from Tamil Nadu
Filmmaking pioneers
20th-century Indian film directors